The  is a Japanese Shinkansen high-speed train type operated by Kyushu Railway Company (JR Kyushu) on the Kyushu Shinkansen high-speed rail line. Built by Hitachi, the trains were introduced on the Tsubame services from March 2004.

It was one of the two recipients of the 45th Laurel Prize awarded by the Japan Railfan Club in 2005.

It abandoned the 700's "duckbill" nose in favor of a sharper nose. The livery is white, with a red stripe.

They also operate some Sakura services within the Kyushu Shinkansen.

Formation

Cars 2 and 5 are equipped with PS207K single-arm pantographs.

Build history

Set U005 was withdrawn on 16 March 2018 following damage sustained from the 2016 Kumamoto earthquakes' 14 April foreshock.

Interior
As the Kyushu Shinkansen runs a large portion in tunnels, designers paid special attention to the interior design of the 800 series to create a more pleasant travel experience. More traditional materials and design features are used to embody Kyushu's warm and natural environment.

Persimmon tannin colour is used for the walls, ancient lacquer for the doors, and Kyushu traditional rope curtain from Yatsushiroigusa for the lavatory are used. The seats are made of wood versus metal/plastic combinations from previous trains and the cushions are produced using Nishijin textiles. Window curtains are produced from prunus serrulata, and interior flooring is also made of wood.

Seating is four abreast (2 by 2), with wheelchair-accessible seating and lavatory facilities in two of the six cars.

New 800 series

JR Kyushu announced in December 2008 that three new 800 series sets would be delivered between summer 2009 and autumn 2010, ahead of the completion of the entire Kyushu Shinkansen route between Hakata and Kagoshima-Chūō in 2011. The first of the new batch, set U007, was delivered in June 2009, and entered service on 22 August 2009. Externally, the new sets feature minor livery changes regarding the red stripe, and internally, each car features different colour seat covers. Sets U007 and U009 include track condition monitoring equipment and are numbered in the 800–1000 series, while set U008 features overhead wire and signal monitoring equipment and is numbered in the 800–2000 series.

Formation

Cars 2 and 5 are equipped with PS207K single-arm pantographs.

Build history

Interior

See also
 List of high speed trains

References

External links

 JR Kyushu Tsubame 800 series information
 Hitachi Transportation Systems Website

Shinkansen train series
Kyushu Railway Company
Hitachi multiple units
Train-related introductions in 2004
Passenger trains running at least at 250 km/h in commercial operations
25 kV AC multiple units